St Finian's Primary School (1901 - 1989) (Irish: Bunscoil Naomh Fionán) was a Roman Catholic primary school located in the Falls Road area of West Belfast near Dunville Park. It was named after Saint Finnian of Clonard and was run by the De La Salle Christian Brothers.

Due to falling student numbers the school closed in the 1980s.

Since 2004 the building has been occupied by the Irish-language primary school Gaelscoil an Lonnáin.  However, the board of governors have proposed that it relocate to the former site of St Comgall's School in Divis Street.

Notable alumni

Former pupils of St. Finian's include:

 James Joseph Magennis (1919 - 1986), who served on midget submarines in WW2, disabled the battle ship Tirpitz and subsequently won the Victoria Cross
 John Loughlin (born 1948), Fellow of St Edmund's College, University of Cambridge and formerly Professor of European Politics at Cardiff University
 Gerry Adams (born 1948), Irish republican politician (president of the Sinn Féin political party, and a Teachta Dála for Louth from 2011 to 2020)
 Martin Dillon (b. 1949) - author
 Gerry Kelly, (born 1953) Irish republican politician and former Provisional Irish Republican Army volunteer, member of Sinn Féin's Ard Chomhairle (National Executive) and MLA for North Belfast

References

Primary schools in Belfast
Catholic primary schools in Northern Ireland
Belfast
Defunct schools in Northern Ireland